E. Lee Getz (born April 2, 1964) is a former American football guard who played for the Kansas City Chiefs in the National Football League (NFL). He played college football at Rutgers University.

Raised in Glen Gardner, New Jersey, Getz played prep football at Voorhees High School, where he also won the state heavyweight wrestling title.

References 

1964 births
Living people
American football offensive guards
American wrestlers
Rutgers Scarlet Knights football players
Kansas City Chiefs players
People from Glen Gardner, New Jersey
Players of American football from New Jersey
Sportspeople from Hunterdon County, New Jersey
Voorhees High School alumni